Because of the Salic law of succession, all monarchs of Hanover were male, electors from 1692 until 1814 and kings from 1814 until 1866. Their wives were thus electresses and then queens.

Electresses

Queens

Spouses of the pretenders

Notes

 
Hanover, Queen Consorts of
Hanover, List of royal consorts of